Those High Grey Walls is a 1939 American crime film directed by Charles Vidor and starring Walter Connolly and Onslow Stevens.

It is also known as The Gates of Alcatraz.

Plot
Dr. MacAuley, a kindly beloved country doctor, is sent to Fillmore Prison. His Crime was for removing a bullet from a young man who was escaping from the police.

Cast
 Walter Connolly as Dr. MacAuley
 Onslow Stevens as Dr. Frank Norton
 Paul Fix as Nightingale
 Bernard Nedell as Redlands
 Iris Meredith as Mary MacAuley
 Oscar O'Shea as Warden
 Nicholas Soussanin as "Lindy" Lindstrom
 Don Beddoe as Jockey

References

External links

American crime drama films
Columbia Pictures films
Films directed by Charles Vidor
Films set in prison
1939 crime drama films
American black-and-white films
1939 films
1930s American films
1930s English-language films